Zadi Diaz is an American producer and director, known for founding the web series Epic Fu, co-hosting the podcast New Mediacracy, and executive producer of YouTube Nation. She has won a number of Webby and Streamy Awards.

Early life
Zadi Diaz was born in Harlem, then grew up in the Washington Heights section of New York City, as well as the South Bronx. She is of Dominican descent.

Career

New Mediacracy
Zadi Diaz co-founded the podcast New Mediacracy in 2006. Created with Steve Woolf and video blogger Steve Garfield, the podcast features candid discussions about online video and new media, and often features popular web series creators as guests.  In 2010, Chris McCaleb of Big Fantastic joined the podcast as a regular.  Notable guests have included Felicia Day, Joe Penna, Illeana Douglas, John August and Paul Scheer.

Epic Fu
She co-founded Epic Fu, which first premiered as JETSET (also referred to as Jet Set Show) on June 1, 2006 and was geared towards a young audience. Amanda Congdon and Andrew Baron were initially tied to the first few episodes of the production, but the partnership dissolved with the Rocketboom split in July 2006.

In April 2007, JETSET was the first established web show to sign with web video studio Next New Networks (NNN). In its tenure with NNN, the show grew from 30,000 to 40,000 views per episode to 3 million views a month. After briefly being signed to West Coast digital studio Revision3 in June 2008, Epic Fu is independently run and distributed through Blip.tv.

Disney Interactive
From 2012-2013 Zadi lead creative development and production for the online originals team at Disney Interactive Media Group. There she developed and produced the web series Where's My Water?: Swampy's Underground Adventures, Talking Friends, Blank: A Vinylmation Love Story, Power Up, Explored, and other digital shorts and one-offs.

Speaking
She has spoken at events such as the New Media Expo in 2008.

Awards

Podcasts
EPIC FU (2006)
New Mediacracy

References

External links

American Internet celebrities
Video bloggers
Living people
Year of birth missing (living people)
American podcasters
American women podcasters
21st-century American women